Haywood is an unincorporated community in Harrison County, West Virginia, United States. Haywood has a post office with ZIP code 26366.

Climate
The climate in this area is characterized by hot, humid summers and generally mild to cool winters.  According to the Köppen Climate Classification system, Haywood has a humid subtropical climate, abbreviated "Cfa" on climate maps.

References

Unincorporated communities in Harrison County, West Virginia
Unincorporated communities in West Virginia